Scott Hamner (born 1956), is an American television writer. He is the son of Earl Hamner Jr., who turned his autobiography into The Waltons.

Positions held
The Homecoming: A Christmas Story (Actor, television movie: 1971) 
Berrenger's (Writer, 2 episodes: 1985)
Boone (Writer, 2 episodes: 1983–84)
Dynasty (Story and/or writer and/or teleplay and/or story editor: Season 6, 1985–86)
Falcon Crest (Writer, 4 episodes: 1982–86)
Knots Landing (Writer, 7 episodes: 1982–91. Story editor, 8 episodes: 1991)
The Waltons (Writer, 3 episodes: 1981)
Second Chances (Executive Story Editor, entire series: 1993–94)
As the World Turns (Writer, Script Writer, 6 episodes: 1995)
Port Charles (Writer, Associate Head Writer, Head Writer: 1997–2000)
The Young and the Restless (Story and/or writer, Co-Head writer: 2006–12)

Awards and nominations
Hamner, as part of the writing teams that he has worked with, has been nominated six times (As the World Turns: 1996, The Young and the Restless: 2007–08 and 2010–12)  for a Daytime Emmy Award in the category Drama Series Writing Team, winning the Emmy in 2011.

Hamner and his writing colleagues were also nominated five times (The Young and the Restless: 2007–08, 2010 and 2012–13) for a Writers Guild of America Award in the category Daytime Serials, winning the award in 2008, 2010 and 2013.

References

External links
 
 CBS Daytime: Y&R
 Hamner 2006 Interview

American soap opera writers
American male screenwriters
Daytime Emmy Award winners
1956 births
Living people
Soap opera producers
American television producers
American male television writers